Virinchi Varma is a Telugu film director. He made his film debut with Uyyala Jampala in 2013 and also directed Majnu, which featured Nani and Anu Emmanuel in the lead roles. The film was released worldwide on 23 September 2016.

Career 
His debut directorial feature film was the 2013 romantic drama, Uyyala Jampala, which was produced by Akkineni Nagarjuna, under Annapurna Studios.

Filmography

References

Telugu film directors
Living people
Year of birth missing (living people)